Mysuru Mithra is an Indian Kannada language morning daily newspaper published from Mysore, India. A regional newspaper, it covers five districts: Mysuru, Mandya, Kodagu, Hassan and Chamarajanagar. This newspaper was launched in 1978. Its founder, editor and publisher is entrepreneur and writer K B Ganapathy.

See also
 Star of Mysore (sister concern)
 List of Kannada-language newspapers
 List of Kannada-language magazines
 List of newspapers in India
 Media in Karnataka
 Media of India

References

External links
 Official site: Mysuru Mithra 
 Official site: Epaper Mysuru Mithra 
 Official site: Star of Mysore (sister concern)

1978 establishments in Karnataka
Kannada-language newspapers
Newspapers established in 1978
Newspapers published in Mysore